Ma Chao (born 13 June 1998) is a Chinese footballer currently playing as a left-back for Xinjiang Tianshan Leopard.

Career statistics

Club
.

References

1998 births
Living people
People from Qingdao
Footballers from Shandong
Chinese footballers
Chinese expatriate footballers
Association football defenders
Campeonato de Portugal (league) players
China League Two players
China League One players
S.C.U. Torreense players
C.D. Pinhalnovense players
Xinjiang Tianshan Leopard F.C. players
Chinese expatriate sportspeople in Portugal
Expatriate footballers in Portugal